Neuburgia is a genus of plants in the family Loganiaceae. It is native to the Bismarck Archipelago, Caroline Islands, Fiji, Maluku Islands, New Caledonia, New Guinea, Philippines, Solomon Islands, Sulawesi, and Vanuatu. It contains the following species (but this list may be incomplete):
 Neuburgia alata (A.C.Sm.) A.C.Smith
 Neuburgia celebica (Koord.) Leenh.
 Neuburgia collina (A.C.Sm) A.C.Smith
 Neuburgia corynocarpa (A.Gray) Leenh.
 Neuburgia kochii (Valeton) Leenh.
 Neuburgia macrocarpa (A.C.Sm.) A.C.Smith
 Neuburgia macroloba (A.C.Sm.) A.C.Smith
 Neuburgia moluccana (Scheff. ex Boerl.) Leenh.
 Neuburgia novocaledonica (Gilg & Gilg-Ben.) J.E.Molina & Struwe
 Neuburgia rumphiana Leenh.
 Neuburgia tuberculata Blume
 Neuburgia tubiflora Bl.

References

 
Gentianales genera
Taxonomy articles created by Polbot